Twisted: The Distorted Mathematics of Greenhouse Denial is a 2007 book by Ian G. Enting, who is the Professorial Research Fellow in the ARC Centre of Excellence for Mathematics and Statistics of Complex Systems (MASCOS) based at the University of Melbourne. The book analyses the arguments of climate change deniers and the use and presentation of statistics.  Enting contends there are contradictions in their various arguments. The author also presents calculations of the actual emission levels that would be required to stabilise CO2 concentrations. This is an update of calculations that he contributed to the pre-Kyoto IPCC report on Radiative Forcing of Climate.

See also
Climate change
Greenhouse effect
Radiative forcing

References

Climate change books
2007 non-fiction books
2007 in the environment
Australian non-fiction books
Statistics books